Lynn Blackwell Dean (December 22, 1923 – July 6, 2022) was an American politician from Louisiana.

Dean was born on December 22, 1923. He graduated from Warren Easton High School in New Orleans, Louisiana in 1940. He became a marine engineer, and founded the Universal Repair Service in 1949 with his twin brother, Orrin. Lynn later established Elevating Boats Inc.

Dean was a member of the St. Bernard Parish school board from 1981 to 1991, and led the St. Bernard Parish Council as president between 1992 and 1996. He served on the Louisiana Senate from 1996 to 2004 as a Republican. He replaced Samuel B. Nunez Jr. in Senate district 1, and was succeeded in office by Walter Boasso.

Dean died on July 6, 2022, at the age of 98.

References

|-

1923 births
2022 deaths
20th-century American engineers
20th-century American politicians
21st-century American politicians
Republican Party Louisiana state senators
School board members in Louisiana
Politicians from New Orleans
Presidents of St. Bernard Parish, Louisiana
American marine engineers
American twins